North Middleton is a village in the civil parish of Borthwick, Midlothian, Scotland. Outlying hamlets include Borthwick and Middleton.

References

External links

FamilySearch - Borthwick Parish, Midlothian, Scotland

Villages in Midlothian